Ivandale is a historic mansion in Martin, Tennessee, USA.

History
The mansion was completed in 1894. It was designed in the Queen Anne architectural style. It was built for Dr Charles Moore Sebastian, a physician who treated patients with yellow fever in 1878. The house was built on the ashes of his former mansion (designed in the Greek Revival architectural style), which had burned down earlier in 1894.

The mansion was purchased by Thomad Dodd in 1968.

Architectural significance
It has been listed on the National Register of Historic Places since March 25, 1982.

References

Houses on the National Register of Historic Places in Tennessee
Queen Anne architecture in Tennessee
Houses completed in 1894
Houses in Weakley County, Tennessee
National Register of Historic Places in Weakley County, Tennessee